Merve Aladağ (1 March 1993) is a Turkish footballer who plays as a striker for Turkish First League club Kdz. Ereğli Belediye Spor with jersey number 23. With her team, she has also played the Champions League. She is a member of the Turkish national team, having made her official debut on 23 November 2011 against Romania, and as a junior international she played the 2012 U-19 European Championship.

Playing career

Club

Aladağ began her career in the high school team of Altınşehir Lisesi Spor, which played in the Turkish Women's Second Football League. Appeared in 17 league matches in the 2010–11 season, she scored a total of 21 goals.

The next season, she was transferred by Ataşehir Belediyesi, a club competing in the Turkish Women's First League. Aladağ netted 27 goals in 21 matches in the 2011–12 season, was named Top Scorer and enjoyed her first league championship. She played in three matches at the 2011–12 UEFA Women's Champions League and scored the only goals of her team in two matches. In the 2012–13 season, she netted 12 goals for Ataşehir Belediyesi in 17 matches.

In the beginning of the 2015–16 league season, Merve Aladağ was 
ttransferred by Kireçburnu Spor. After three seasons with the Istanbul-based club, she moved to Kdz. Ereğlispor in October 2018.

International
Aladağ made her national team debut on 23 November 2011 in the UEFA Women's Euro 2013 qualifying – Group 2 match against the Romanian team.

She played for the Turkey U-19 national team in four games, the first on 8 May 2012. She scored a goal in the friendly match against the Hungarian team on 8 May 2012.

Career statistics
.

Honors

Club
 Turkey Women's First Football League
 Ataşehir Belediyespor
 Winners (1): 2011–12
 Runners-up (3): 2012–13, 2013–14, 2014–15

Individual
 Turkish Women's First League
 Top Scorer 2011–12 – (27 goals) with Ataşehir Belediyespor

References

External links
 

Living people
1993 births
People from Akçadağ
Turkish women's footballers
Women's association football forwards
Ataşehir Belediyespor players
Kireçburnu Spor players
Karadeniz Ereğlispor players
Turkish Women's Football Super League players
Turkey women's international footballers